The Conguito sea catfish (Cathorops liropus) is a species of catfish in the family Ariidae. It was described by Susan Brown Bristol in 1897. It is a tropical, freshwater catfish which occurs in Mexico.

References

Ariidae
Fish described in 1897